Robert Brank Vance (1793 – November 6, 1827) was a Congressional Representative from North Carolina

He was born on Reems Creek, near Asheville, North Carolina, in 1793; attended the common schools and Newton Academy, Asheville, N.C.; studied medicine at the medical school of Dr. Charles Harris in Cabarrus County, North Carolina; commenced the practice of medicine in Asheville, N.C., in 1818; held several local offices; elected to the Eighteenth Congress (March 4, 1823 – March 3, 1825); unsuccessful candidate for reelection in 1824 to the Nineteenth Congress and for election in 1826 to the Twentieth Congress; was mortally wounded by Hon. Samuel Price Carson, the successful candidate, who challenged him to a duel, fought at Saluda Gap, North Carolina, because of a derogatory remark made during the campaign of 1826, to the effect that the latter's father had turned Tory during the Revolutionary War; died the following day near Saluda Gap, N.C., 1827; friend of Carson's, famed frontiersman and congressman David Crockett of Tennessee was present for the duel.  Interment in the family burial ground on Reems Creek, near Asheville, N.C.  Uncle of Robert Brank Vance (1828–1899) and Zebulon Baird Vance.

See also 
 Eighteenth United States Congress

External links
 U.S. Congress Biographical Directory entry
 The Saluda Gap duel (about halfway down; marked 'Page 6')
 sunsite.utk.edu

1793 births
1827 deaths
19th-century American politicians
American politicians killed in duels
Deaths by firearm in North Carolina
Democratic-Republican Party members of the United States House of Representatives from North Carolina
People from Asheville, North Carolina
Physicians from North Carolina
Vance family